BoDeans is an American rock band. The band has released 14 studio albums, four live albums, seven singles, and two compilation albums.

Albums

Studio albums

Compilations and live albums

Singles

Promotional singles

Videography
 Homebrewed: Live from the Pabst (2005, DVD)

Music videos
 "She's a Runaway" (1986)
 "Fadeaway" (1986)
 "Only Love" (1987)
 "Dreams" (1988)
 "Good Work" (1989)
 "You Don't Get Much" (1989)
 "Good Things" (1991)
 "Black White & Blood Red" (1991)
 "Closer to Free" (1996)
 "All the World" (2012)
 "American" (2012)

References

External links
BoDeans

Pop music group discographies